Velimeşe is a  town in Tekirdağ Province, in the European part of Turkey.

Geography 
Velimeşe is a town in Çorlu district  of Tekirdağ Province. 
It is situated in Rumeli (Thrace, the European part of Turkey) to the north of  Çorlu Creek (a tributary of Ergene River) and  motorway which connects İstanbul to Kapıkule the Bulgarian border.

History 
In the 19th century in the place of the town there was a public farm used for military training. The name of the farm was Velipaşa referring an Ottoman pasha. After the Russo-Turkish War (1877-1878) Turkish refugees from Bulgaria and Serbia were settled in the farm and the settlement was named as Velimeşe. In the early 20th century there were two temporary occupations of the settlement. In 1912 it was occupied by  Bulgaria during the First Balkan War, but it was returned to Turkey during the Second Balkan War. Between 1920 and 1922 following the First World War, it was occupied by Greece.   On 15 October 1922 Velimeşe was returned to Turkey. In 1974 the settlement was declared a seat of township.

Economy
Velimeşe is a flourishing town. Corn, sunflower and cereals are among the main crops. But the majority of town residents work in factories around the town.

References

Populated places in Tekirdağ Province
Towns in Turkey
Çorlu District